Jeffrey D. "Jeff" Thompson (born September 16, 1963) is an American politician who served as a member of the Idaho House of Representatives from 2008 to 2018.

Education
Thompson earned a Bachelor of Science in business administration and finance from Liberty University, a Master of Science in human resource training and development from Idaho State University, and then a Master of Business Administration from Liberty University.

Career 
Prior to entering politics, Thompson worked as a consultant for the Idaho National Laboratory.

Thompson was elected to the Idaho House of Representatives for the first time in November 2008 and assumed office on December 1, 2008. He served until 2012. He then represented the 30th district in the House from 2012 to 2018. Thompson lost re-election in the May 2018 Republican primary to Gary Marshall, taking only 40% of the vote.

In the 2012 Republican Party presidential candidates, Thompson supported Mitt Romney. In the 2016 Republican Party presidential primaries, Thompson supported Senator Marco Rubio.

In 2018, Thompson ran against incumbent Mayor Rebecca Casper and Barbara Ehardt for mayor of Idaho Falls, Idaho. Thompson finished third and did not qualify for the runoff election.

Election history

References

External links
Jeff Thompson at the Idaho Legislature

1963 births
21st-century American politicians
Idaho State University alumni
Liberty University alumni
Living people
Republican Party members of the Idaho House of Representatives
People from Harlingen, Texas
People from Idaho Falls, Idaho